Robert Lloyd "Rob" Partridge (born 11 September 1985) is a Welsh former professional cyclist from Wrexham, Wales. He represented Wales in the 2006 Commonwealth Games. Inspired after watching the Tour de France on television, he joined the Wrexham Roads Club at an early age. Partridge rode for the  team from 2010 to 2012 and rode for the  team in 2008 and Team Halfords Bikehut in 2009. He was living with the Under 23 GB Squad in Quarrata, Tuscany until June 2007.

He joined  for 2013. After one season Partridge was announced as a member of the  squad for the 2015 season.

Major results

2003
 1st Corrado GP (National Junior Series Event)
2004
 4th Road race, Welsh Road Championships
2005
 5th Road race, National Under-23 Road Championships
2006
 2nd Overall Girvan Three Day
1st Stage 1
 2nd Beaumont Tour
 3rd Tour of the South
2007
 1st  Road race, National Under-23 Road Championships
 2nd Tour of Pendle – Premier Calendar Series
 3rd Milano – Busseto
2008
 1st Road race, Welsh Road Championships
 2nd Overall Girvan Three Day
1st Stage 3
 3rd Overall Rás Tailteann
 4th Overall Bikeline 2 Day
 5th Overall Tour of the Reservoir
 5th Clayton Velo Spring Classic
2009
 1st Road race, Welsh Road Championships
 3rd Tour of the Reservoir
 9th Warwick Town Centre Race
2010
 1st Ryedale Grand Prix
 5th East Yorkshire Classic
 6th Overall Rás Tailteann
 6th Chas Messenger Road Race
 8th Overall Tour of Britain
 10th Blackpool Nocturne
2011
 1st Round 6, Tour Series
 7th East Yorkshire Classic
 9th Overall Cinturón a Mallorca
2012
 1st Mountains classification Tour de Bretagne
 9th Overall Tour Doon Hame
2013
 2nd Perfs Pedal Race
 6th Ryedale Grand Prix
2014
 1st Jock Wadley Memorial Road Race
 3rd Eddie Soens Memorial
 4th Ryedale Grand Prix
 7th Road race, National Road Championships
 9th Stafford GP
2015
 4th Overall Rás Tailteann
 5th Betty Pharoah Memorial Legstretchers Road Race
 6th Severn Bridge Road Race
 10th Grand Prix of Wales
2016
 4th Scorpion CS Road Race
 5th Severn Bridge Road Race
2017
 7th Rad am Ring

References

External links

1985 births
Living people
Welsh male cyclists
Cyclists at the 2006 Commonwealth Games
Commonwealth Games competitors for Wales
Sportspeople from Wrexham